Gamma ray cross section - a measure of the probability that gamma ray interacts with matter. The total cross section of gamma ray interactions is composed of several independent processes: photoelectric effect, Compton scattering, electron-positron pair production in the nucleus field and electron-positron pair production in the electron field (triplet production). The cross section for single process listed above is a part of the total gamma ray cross section.

Other effects, like the photonuclear absorption, Thomson or Rayleigh (coherent) scattering can be omitted because of their nonsignificant contribution in the gamma ray range of energies.

The detailed equations for cross sections (barn/atom) of all mentioned effects connected with gamma ray interaction with matter are listed below.

Photoelectric effect cross section

This phenomenon describes the situation in which a gamma photon interacts with an electron located in the atomic structure. This results the ejection of that electron from the atom. The photoelectric effect is the dominant energy transfer mechanism for X-ray and gamma ray photons with energies below 50 keV, but it is much less important at higher energies, but still need to be taken into consideration.

Usually, the cross section of the photoeffect can be approximated by the simplified equation of

where k = Eγ / Ee, and where Eγ = hν is the photon energy given in eV and Ee = me c2 ≈ 5,11∙105 eV is the electron rest mass energy, Z is an atomic number of the absorber’s element, α = e2/(ħc) ≈ 1/137 is the fine structure constant, and re2 = e4/Ee2 ≈ 0.07941 b is the square of the classical electron radius.

For higher precision, however, the Sauter equation is much appropriate:

where

and EB is a binding energy of electron, and ϕ0 is a Thomson cross section (ϕ0 = 8πe4/(3Ee2) ≈ 0.66526 barn).

For higher energies (>0.5 MeV) the cross section of the photoelectric effect is very small because other effects (especially Compton scattering) dominates. However, for precise calculations of the photoeffect cross section in high energy range, the Sauter equation shall be substituted by the Pratt-Scofield equation

where all input parameters are presented in the Table below.

Compton scattering cross section

Compton scattering (or Compton effect) is an interaction in which an incident gamma photon interact with an atomic electron to cause its ejection and scatter of the original photon with lower energy. The probability of Compton scattering decreases with increasing photon energy. Compton scattering is thought to be the principal absorption mechanism for gamma rays in the intermediate energy range 100 keV to 10 MeV.

The cross section of the Compton effect is described by the Klein-Nishina equation:

for energies higher than 100 keV (k>0.2). For lower energies, however, this equation shall be substituted by:

which is proportional to the absorber’s atomic number, Z.

The additional cross section connected with the Compton effect can be calculated for the energy transfer coefficient only – the absorption of the photon energy by the electron:

which is often used in radiation protection calculations.

Pair production (in nucleus field) cross section

By interaction with the electric field of a nucleus, the energy of the incident photon is converted into the mass of an electron-positron (e−e+) pair. The cross section for the pair production effect is usually described by the Maximon equation:

 for low energies (k<4),

where

.

However, for higher energies (k>4) the Maximon equation has a form of

where ζ(3)≈1.2020569 is the Riemann zeta function. The energy threshold for the pair production effect is k=2 (the positron and electron rest mass energy).

Triplet production cross section

The triplet production effect, where positron and electron is produced in the field of other electron, is similar to the pair production, with the threshold at k=4. This effect, however, is much less probable than the pair production in the nucleus field. The most popular form of the triplet cross section was formulated as Borsellino-Ghizzetti equation

where a=-2.4674 and b=-1.8031. This equation is quite long, so Haug proposed simpler analytical forms of triplet cross section. Especially for the lowest energies 4<k<4.6:

For 4.6<k<6:

For 6<k<18:

For k>14 Haug proposed to use a shorter form of Borsellino equation:

Total cross section

One can present the total cross section per atom as a simple sum of each effects:

Next, using the Beer–Lambert–Bouguer law, one can calculate the linear attenuation coefficient for the photon interaction with an absorber of atomic density N:

or the mass attenuation coefficient:

where ρ is mass density, u is an atomic mass unit, a A is the atomic mass of the absorber.

This can be directly used in practice, e.g. in the radiation protection.

The analytical calculation of the cross section of each specific phenomenon is rather difficult because appropriate equations are long and complicated. Thus, the total cross section of gamma interaction can be presented in one phenomenological equation formulated by Fornalski, which can be used instead:

where ai,j parameters are presented in Table below. This formula is an approximation of the total cross section of gamma rays interaction with matter, for different energies (from 1 MeV to 10 GeV, namely 2<k<20,000) and absorber’s atomic numbers (from Z=1 to 100).

For lower energy region (<1 MeV) the Fornalski equation is more complicated due to the larger function variability of different elements. Therefore the modified equation

is a good approximation for photon energies from 150 keV to 10 MeV, where the photon energy E is given in MeV, and ai,j parameters are presented in Table below with much better precision. Analogically, the equation is valid for all Z from 1 to 100.

XCOM Database of cross sections

The US National Institute of Standards and Technology published on-line a complete and detailed database of cross section values of X-ray and gamma ray interactions with different materials in different energies. The database, called XCOM, contains also linear and mass attenuation coefficients, which are useful for practical applications.

See also

Cross section (physics)
Gamma ray
Linear attenuation coefficient
Mass attenuation coefficient
Neutron cross section
Nuclear cross section

External links
XCOM Database

References 

Atomic physics
Physical quantities
Measurement
Nuclear physics
Gamma rays
Radiation